Wakamiya was a seaplane carrier of the Imperial Japanese Navy and the first Japanese aircraft carrier. She was converted from a transport ship into a seaplane carrier and commissioned in August 1914. She was equipped with four Japanese-built French Maurice Farman seaplanes (powered by Renault  engines). In September 1914, she conducted the world's first naval-launched air raids.

Early career
Wakamiya was initially the Russian freighter Lethington, built by Duncan in Port Glasgow, United Kingdom, laid down in 1900 and launched 21 September 1900. She was captured on a voyage from Cardiff to Vladivostok during the Russo-Japanese War near Okinoshima in 1905 by the Japanese torpedo boat TB No. 72. She was acquired by the Japanese government, renamed Takasaki-Maru until given the official name of Wakamiya-Maru on 1 September, and from 1907 was managed as a transport ship by NYK.

In 1913 she was transferred to the Imperial Japanese Navy and converted to a seaplane carrier, being completed on 17 August 1914. She was a 7,720-ton ship, with a complement of 234. She had two seaplanes on deck and two in reserve. Wakamiya did not possess a catapult; the seaplanes were lowered onto the water with a crane, whence they would take off, and then be retrieved from the water once their mission was completed.

Siege of Tsingtao
From 5 September 1914, Wakamiya conducted the world's first naval-launched air raids during the first months of the First World War from Kiaochow Bay off Tsingtao, which is located in China. On 6 September 1914 a Farman aircraft launched by Wakamiya attacked the Austro-Hungarian cruiser Kaiserin Elisabeth and the German gunboat Jaguar in Qiaozhou Bay; neither ship was hit. Her seaplanes bombarded German-held land targets (communication centers and command centers) in the Tsingtao peninsula of Shandong province and ships in Qiaozhou Bay from September to 6 November 1914, during the Siege of Tsingtao.

British officers serving in the Battle of Tsingtao commented on the operations of the Wakamiya:

[[File:FarmanTsingtao.jpg|thumb|Two of Wakamiya'''s Maurice Farman seaplanes stationed on land in Tsingtao after 30 September 1914.]]

On 30 September, Wakamiya struck a German mine and had to be repaired for a week. On this occasion, her seaplanes were transferred on land at Shazikou (沙子口海岸), from where they accomplished further scouting and attack missions:

Altogether the seaplanes made 49 attacks, dropping 190 bombs on German defenses until the German surrender on 7 November. According to the British Naval Attaché to Tokyo, Captain Hon. Hubert Brand, who had been stationed for three months on Imperial Japanese Navy warships throughout the battle, the bombs used by the seaplanes were about equivalent to 12 pdr. shells.

Later developmentsWakamiya was modified as a regular aircraft carrier with a launch platform on the foredeck in April 1920 (when she was renamed Wakamiya-kan 若宮艦). She accomplished in June 1920 the first Japanese take-off from an aircraft carrier. It is thought she had a pioneering role in developing aircraft carrier techniques for the Japanese aircraft carrier Hosho, the first purpose-built aircraft carrier in the world.

She was used as a trials ship after 1924, stricken 1 April 1931, and scrapped in 1932.

Notes

References
"Sabre et pinceau", Christian Polak, Chambre de Commerce et d'Industrie Française au Japon.Histories of Naval organizations #8, author: Ministry of the Navy, printed: Hara Shobō (Japan), original plot in January 1940, reprinted in October 1971
Monthly Ships of the World,  (Japan)
No. 481, Special issue Vol. 40, "History of Japanese aircraft carriers", May 1994
No. 522, Special issue Vol. 47, "Auxiliary Vessels of the Imperial Japanese Navy"'', March 1997

External links
IJN Wakayama seaplane carrier
World aircraft carrier list: IJN Wakamiya
The Wakayama-Maru off Tsingtao
Operations of Tsingtao (Japanese)
Japanese aviation chronology (Japanese)

Merchant ships of the United Kingdom
Ships built on the River Clyde
1900 ships
Merchant ships of Japan
Aircraft carriers of the Imperial Japanese Navy
World War I aircraft carriers of Japan
Russo-Japanese War naval ships of Russia